= Pipli Ahiran =

Pipli Ahiran is a village situated in Railmagra Tehsil of Rajsamand, Rajasthan. It's a small village with a population of 8000. It has a panchayat samite office in it including other two villages Meghakheda & Prempura. There is a senior secondary School in the village.
